Soe Min Hteik-Tin was the chief queen consort of Toungoo from 1510 to 1530. Her reign title was Thiri Atula Maha Nanda Dewi. She was a daughter of Viceroy Min Sithu of Toungoo. In 1485, her first cousin Mingyi Nyo assassinated her father because he had refused give her in marriage to Nyo. She became the chief queen consort in 1510 when Nyo declared independence from Ava (Inwa). On 11 April 1511, at the coronation ceremony, she was crowned the chief queen with the title Thiri Atula Maha Nanda Dewi.

The queen had a daughter, who was married to Shwe Myat, son of the Lord of Taungdwin.

Ancestry
The following is the family tree of Queen Soe Min, according to the royal chronicles. Her parents were first cousins, both descended from the Ava royalty. Her great grandfathers Minye Kyawswa (of the Forty Years' War fame) and Sithu of Paukmyaing were grandsons of King Swa Saw Ke of Ava.

Notes

References

Bibliography
 
 

Chief queens consort of Toungoo dynasty
16th-century Burmese women
15th-century Burmese women